Maya Awards may refer to:
 Maya Awards (Indonesia), an annual Indonesian film awards initiated in 2012
 Maya Awards (Thailand), an annual entertainment award presented by Maya Channel Magazine in Thailand